Giannis Bourousis Karditsa New Indoor Arena, or  Giannis Bourousis Karditsa New Indoor Hall (Greek: Νέο Κλειστό Γυμναστήριο Καρδίτσας Ιωάννης Μπουρούσης), is a multi-purpose and multi-sport indoor arena that is located in the Agia Paraskevi neighborhood of Karditsa, Thessaly, Greece. The arena can be used to host cultural events, concerts and handball, volleyball, and basketball games. It is mainly used to host basketball games.

The arena's total seating capacity for sporting events, including collapsible seats, is 3,007 people, and it's capacity for concerts and cultural events is 4,680 people. The arena also features a 118 seat conference room. The arena is named in honor of the former player and President of the Karditsa basketball club, Giannis Bourousis.

History
Construction on the arena began in 2014, and it was completed in 2019. Upon completion, the arena featured a permanent seating capacity of 2,505 people, which could later be expanded to a total capacity of 3,007 people, with the addition of a 502-seat collapsible tier. The arena officially opened on 2 November 2019, with its name at the time of its opening being either the Karditsa New Indoor Arena, or the Karditsa New Indoor Hall (Greek: Νέο Κλειστό Γυμναστήριο Καρδίτσας).

Upon its opening, the arena became the home venue of the Greek professional basketball club Karditsa. The club played their first home game at the arena, on the day of its opening, in a Greek 2nd Division game, during the 2019–20 season, against Charilaos Trikoupis. Charilaos Trikoupis won the game, by a score of 73–62.

The arena was officially renamed to Ioannis Bourousis New Indoor Arena, in a ceremony honoring the former Greek national team player, on 17 September 2022. In 2022, the 502 seat collapsible tier was finally added to the arena's seating capacity.

See also
List of indoor arenas in Greece

References

External links
Αναβαθμίζεται εκ νέου το μεγάλο κλειστό της Καρδίτσας! 
Νέο Κλειστό Γυμναστήριο 
Στο νέο κλειστό γυμναστήριο Καρδίτσας προϋπολογισμού 7,4 εκατ. ευρώ ο Περιφερειάρχης Θεσσαλίας(φωτό) 

Basketball venues in Greece
Handball venues in Greece
Indoor arenas in Greece
Sports venues completed in 2019
Volleyball venues in Greece